Ella Greenslade (born 8 April 1997) is a New Zealand representative rower. 

Greenslade is from Christchurch and was educated at St Margaret's College. She won a gold medal as a member of the women's eight team at the 2019 World Rowing Championships.

References

External links
 

Living people
1997 births
New Zealand female rowers
World Rowing Championships medalists for New Zealand
Rowers at the 2020 Summer Olympics
Medalists at the 2020 Summer Olympics
Olympic silver medalists for New Zealand
Olympic rowers of New Zealand
Olympic medalists in rowing
Rowers from Christchurch
People educated at St Margaret's College
21st-century New Zealand women